Waterford is the eighth largest city in Stanislaus County, California, United States. The population was 8,456 at the 2010 census, up from 6,924 as of the 2000 census. Waterford is part of the Modesto Metropolitan Statistical Area.

Geography
Waterford is located at  (37.645132, -120.767609).

The city was founded around the Tuolumne River.

Demographics

2010
The 2010 United States Census reported that Waterford had a population of 32,146. The racial makeup of Waterford was 10,003 (71.0%) White, 10,023 (0.9%) African American, 120 (1.3%) Native American, 1,222(1.5%) Asian, 221 (0.1%) Pacific Islander, 10,747 (20.6%) from other races, and 386 (4.6%) from two or more races. Hispanic or Latino of any race were 3,579 persons (42.3%).

The Census reported that 31,433 people (99.7% of the population) lived in households, 713 (0.3%) lived in non-institutionalized group quarters, and 0 (0%) were institutionalized.

There were 2,458 households, out of which 1,314 (53.5%) had children under the age of 18 living in them, 1,499 (61.0%) were opposite-sex married couples living together, 357 (14.5%) had a female householder with no husband present, 191 (7.8%) had a male householder with no wife present. There were 172 (7.0%) unmarried opposite-sex partnerships, and 15 (0.6%) same-sex married couples or partnerships. 305 households (12.4%) were made up of individuals, and 106 (4.3%) had someone living alone who was 65 years of age or older. The average household size was 3.43. There were 2,047 families (83.3% of all households); the average family size was 3.71.

The population was spread out, with 2,786 people (32.9%) under the age of 18, 902 people (10.7%) aged 18 to 24, 2,295 people (27.1%) aged 25 to 44, 1,860 people (22.0%) aged 45 to 64, and 613 people (7.2%) who were 65 years of age or older. The median age was 29.6 years. For every 100 females, there were 103.1 males. For every 100 females age 18 and over, there were 98.4 males.

The homeowner vacancy rate was 2.5%; the rental vacancy rate was 7.1%. 5,489 people (64.9% of the population) lived in owner-occupied housing units and 2,944 people (34.8%) lived in rental housing units.

2000
As of the census of 2000, there were 6,923 people, 1,991 households, and 1,682 families residing in the city. The racial makeup of the city was 12.24% White, 0.48% African American, 1.53% Native American, 0.75% Asian, 0.16% Pacific Islander, 19.99% from other races, and 4.85% from two or more races. Hispanic or Latino of any race were 78.44% of the population.

There were 1,990 households, out of which 52.8% had children under the age of 18 living with them, 63.6% were married couples living together, 13.6% had a female householder with no husband present, and 15.5% were non-families. 11.4% of all households were made up of individuals, and 5.2% had someone living alone who was 65 years of age or older. The average household size was 3.47 and the average family size was 3.71.

36.4% of Waterford's inhabitants were under the age of 18, 9.6% from 18 to 24, 30.9% from 25 to 44, 15.9% from 45 to 64, and 7.1% who were 65 years of age or older. The median age was 28 years. For every 100 females, there were 101.4 males. For every 100 females age 18 and over, there were 99.0 males.

The median income for a household in the city was $39,286, and the median income for a family was $41,698. Males had a median income of $32,530 versus $25,341 for females. The per capita income for the city was $13,933. About 11.2% of families and 12.3% of the population were below the poverty line, including 13.2% of those under age 18 and 10.0% of those age 65 or over.

Politics

Education 
Waterford Unified School District is the sole school district.

The Waterford Elementary School is named after the former school superintendent and former elementary school teacher, Richard Moon. The school mascot is the moon cub (a tiger cub) and serves grade K-3. Immediately next to Richard Moon Elementary is the Waterford Head Start Program, which includes state preschool, full day Head Start, and half day Head Start.

Lucille Whitehead Intermediate School shares a campus with Moon School and was first opened for the 2008–2009 school year. The school was dedicated in honor of Lucille Bishop Whitehead. The mascot is the Bobcat.

Waterford Junior High serves grades 7–8. It is the oldest school in the Waterford School District. Their mascot is the tiger.

 Waterford High School was built in 2001. Around 3,231 students attend the High School. The WHS mascot is the Wildcat. WHS Website

History 
The community which became Waterford began to form in the latter half of the 19th century, after surrounding regions became populated with 49ers. At this time the area was known as Bakersville, after one of the town's influential members. It soon became apparent that mail was being mistaken between Bakersville and Bakersfield, California, and the smaller of the two was forced to change its name. At that time, the Tuolumne River did not have a bridge, and instead was crossed by Roberts Ferry on the waterfront. Since the area was well known for this ford, the town adopted the name of Waterford. For several decades, a regular steam locomotive could traverse the Tuolumne in Waterford on a trestle bridge, which was demolished in the second half of the 20th century. There are now no longer railway lines running through or near Waterford, even though many maps will still show the tracks going through the post office building.

Transportation

The city is served by Stanislaus Regional Transit Authority bus service.

Waterford has two main highways: CR J9, "F Street", and State Route 132, "Yosemite Blvd." Both intersect in Waterford. "F Street" goes to Oakdale to the north, and Turlock to the south. Yosemite goes to Modesto westbound, and to the Gold Country eastbound.

The Hickman-Waterford bridge is also located in Waterford. It is the only bridge for about  both east and west to cross the Tuolumne River after Geer Road.

Notes
 Earth Metrics Incorporated, "Waterford Junior High School, California Environmental Quality Act, Environmental Assessment", Waterford Unified School District, prepared for the State of California Environmental Clearinghouse, Report No. 7895W1.001, February 2, 1990.

References

External links

1969 establishments in California
Populated places established in 1969
Cities in Stanislaus County, California
Incorporated cities and towns in California